William Robert Gorham Ebun Priddy, or Bill Priddy or Willie Priddy (1926–2003) was a prominent Creole physician. Priddy was one of the most successful and notable Creole doctors and he worked at Connaught Hospital in Freetown, Sierra Leone. Priddy studied at Leeds University in 1956 after winning a prestigious scholarship. Priddy was also elevated to the fellowship of Royal College of Obstetricians and Gynaecologists (FRCOG).

Early life
Bill Priddy was born in 1926 in Victoria, Cameroon to Sierra Leone Creole parents of Barbadian, Jamaican Maroon, African American, and Liberated African descent, Alvan Priddy and Rebecca Priddy, née Dove.

Education
Priddy went to Ebenezer Primary school in Freetown, and later attended the Prince of Wales School (Freetown, Sierra Leone), where his academic achievements were recognized and he won his scholarship.

Background
Priddy was married to Betty De Moes and later on to Sento. Priddy had five children and eleven grandchildren, and his son Alvan studied in England.

Sources

http://www.bmimakeanenquiry.co.uk/gynaehealth/whp_consultants_detail.cfm?consultant_id=8588

1926 births
2003 deaths
Sierra Leone Creole people
People of Sierra Leone Creole descent
Sierra Leonean people of Caribbean descent
Sierra Leonean people of Barbadian descent